Paungbyin Township  is a township in Mawlaik District in the Sagaing Division of Burma. The principal town is Paungbyin.

References

External links
Maplandia World Gazetteer - map showing the township boundary

Townships of Sagaing Region